Football Club Volov 1929 Shumen is a Bulgarian football club, playing in the city of Shumen, which currently competes in the North-East Third League. The club was established in 1929 under the name "Panayot Volov", and folded its senior team in 2014, before being 'refounded' in July 2018. Shumen last played in the top tier of Bulgarian football during the 1999–2000 season. They play their home games on "Panayot Volov", with a historic capacity of 24,390 people and a current one of 3,500. The team's first kit colors are yellow and blue.

Because of the city's famous brand of Shumensko beer, they are often affectionately called Пивоварите, or The Brewers.

History
FC Shumen (then called Panayot Volov) participated in the State Championship as Shumen region champion in 1934–35 and reached the semifinals. The club was again champion of Shumen region in 1935–36 and 1936–37, but was eliminated during the first matches of the State Championship. The club subsequently went through further name changes, including to DFS Shumen in 1980, Madara Shumen in 1984, and FC Shumen in 1985.

After a successful spell in the Bulgarian A Professional Football Group during the early and late 1990s, which included a 4th-place finish in 1993–94, this led to a UEFA Cup participation. Shumen was drawn against Cypriot side Anorthosis Famagusta. Shumen lost both games, and were eliminated in their only European participation. In the upcoming years, the club lost its main sponsors and went bankrupt. A newly formed entity acquired its license and merged with Yunak Shumen in 2001, eventually becoming FC Shumen 2001. The club briefly returned to its original name of Panayot Volov in 2007, before entering financial difficulties once more and being renamed to Shumen 2010 as it was demoted to the V group, the third tier in Bulgarian football.

The club regained its position in professional football after a two-year absence by winning the 2011–12 Northeastern V Amateur Group, but finished 12th out of 14 teams in its first season back, and was relegated back to the third division for the 2013–14 season. Shumen 2010 finished 14th in the 2013/14 V AFG campaign, which meant they were relegated to the regional divisions. However, due to continuing financial difficulties the club folded before the start of the 2014/15 season, and fielded youth teams only in the following four seasons.

On 26 July 2018, the team was restored under the name Volov 1929 Shumen and filed a request for participation in the 2018–19 season of the Bulgarian Third League. On 30 July they were accepted, and faced Lokomotiv Ruse in their return to the 3rd division, losing the game 2–1. They were relegated at the end of the season, but returned to the Third League in the 2021–22 season.

PFC Shumen have played in the A Professional Group for a total of seven seasons: 1972–1973, 1983–1984, 1993–1996 and 1998–2000. The club reached the semifinals of the Bulgarian Cup on two occasions, in 1957 and 2006, when they narrowly lost 2:1 to Cherno More Varna after extra time.

Honours
A PFG
 4th place: 1993–94
 Semifinalist in the national championship: 1935
B PFG
 Champions (2): 1971–72, 1982–83
 Runners-up (5): 1953–54, 1956–57, 1980–81, 1981–82, 1992–93
North-East V AFG
 Champions (3): 1986–87, 1990–91, 2011–12
Bulgarian Cup
 Semi-finalists (2): 1956–57, 2005–06
 Quarter-finalists (2): 1975–76, 1999–00

Naming history
 Panayot Volov (December 1, 1929 - 1946)
 Yunak-Botev-Volov (1946 - 1947)
 Panayot Volov (1947 - 1980)
 FC Shumen (1980 - 1985)
 FC Madara (1985 - 1989)
 FC Shumen (1989 - 2001)
 Shumen 2001 (2001 - 2007)
 Panayot Volov (2007 - 2010)
 Macaque 2008 (2010 - 2011) (after split of "Makak" (Makak district, Shumen) from "OFG Shumen")
 Shumen 2010 (2011 - 2014) (after "Rapid" (Divdyadovo, Shumen) merged into club)
 Volov (2018 - Present)

Statistics

European record
UEFA Cup:

League positions

League season to season (1948-2022)

Total seasons in A Group: 7
Total seasons in B Group: 47
Total seasons in V Group: 15
Total seasons in A RFG: 2

References

External links
 Club profile at bgclubs.eu (in Bulgarian)

Football clubs in Shumen
1929 establishments in Bulgaria
2010 establishments in Bulgaria
2018 establishments in Bulgaria